Richard Matthew Trachok (December 27, 1925 – August 2, 2020) was an American university athletic director and college football coach. He served as the head coach at the University of Nevada, Reno from 1959 to 1968. He amassed a 40–48–3 record during his tenure. Trachok served as the University of Nevada athletic director until 1986.

During World War II, he served in the United States Army Air Corps. He then attended the University of Nevada, Reno, where he played on the football team as a halfback from 1946 to 1948.

Trachok coached the Reno High School football team, where the Deseret News described him as "one of Nevada's most successful high school gridiron coaches." During a coaching clinic held in 1957 at the University of Utah, he recommended that coaches keep their offenses and defenses simple.

In April 1959, Nevada hired Trachok as its head coach. In November 1960, Trachok canceled a six-hour flight to Denver in favor of a 32-hour bus ride after a plane crash killed sixteen players from California Polytechnic. The Nevada flight had been booked with Arctic-Pacific, the same carrier that Cal Poly had used. Trachok finished his coaching tenure with a 40–48–3 record, and took over as Nevada's athletic director. He held that post until 1986. In 1975, the university inducted Trachok into the Nevada Athletics Hall of Fame.

Trachok died on August 2, 2020, at the age of 94.

Head coaching record

College

References

1925 births
2020 deaths
American football fullbacks
American football halfbacks
Nevada Wolf Pack athletic directors
Nevada Wolf Pack football coaches
Nevada Wolf Pack football players
High school football coaches in Nevada
People from Somerset County, Pennsylvania
Military personnel from Pennsylvania
Coaches of American football from Pennsylvania
Players of American football from Pennsylvania
Sportspeople from Reno, Nevada